Patel Halt is a small railway station in Patna district, Bihar, India. Its railway station code is PATL. It serves many villages around Bihta and Sadisopur in the Patna district. Due to this small but functional railway station many students, government employees, and old people including patients get easy access to basic transportation to Patna. The station consists of 2 platforms. Tickets are available through manual punching machines.

This railway station was named after Sardar Vallabhbhai Patel, popularly known as Sardar Patel, who was the first Deputy Prime Minister of India. The nearest village to this railway station is Shahwajpur, which takes care of the platforms. In recent years, the village got connected by good roads but previously it was basically catered by Patel Halt.

Many of the young generation from the nearby villages have excelled in different areas like Engineering, Medical and Scientific research. Dr. Jitendra Sinha from the village Shahwajpur is a famous Neuroscientist and Professor who has traveled across the globe and working in the research areas of obesity and ageing.

References

External links 

 Official website of the Patna district

Railway stations in Patna
Railway stations in Patna district
Danapur railway division